Elena Anaya Gutiérrez (born 17 July 1975) is a Spanish actress.

She garnered public recognition in Spain for her performance in Sex and Lucia (2001), which also earned her a nomination to the Goya Award for Best Supporting Actress. She starred in The Skin I Live In (2011), for which she won the Goya Award for Best Actress. She is also known for her roles as one of Dracula's brides in Van Helsing (2004), the Spanish tourist in Room in Rome (2010) and Doctor Poison in Wonder Woman (2017).

Early life
Anaya was born in Palencia, Spain. She is the youngest of three children. Her mother, Elena (Nena), is a housewife who later owned a boarding house in Palencia. Her father, Juan José Anaya Gómez (1934–2011), was an industrial engineer.

Career
Anaya moved to Cádiz to train as an actress, after which she landed roles in África and Familia.

She first received international attention in 2001 for her role in the sexually explicit drama Sex and Lucía. She also had a small part the year after in Almodóvar's Talk to Her.

Her best-known Hollywood film role was as Aleera, one of Dracula's brides in 2004's Van Helsing. That same year, Anaya was named as one of European films' Shooting Stars by European Film Promotion.

In 2006, Anaya appeared in Justin Timberlake's music video for his single, "SexyBack".

After some "quiet" years playing supporting roles in international films such as Savage Grace (2007) and Cairo Time (2009), Anaya roared back into prominence with a starring role in 2010's Room in Rome, and then a return to Almodóvar in 2011's The Skin I Live In.

In 2017, Anaya appeared as Doctor Poison in the superhero blockbuster film, Wonder Woman.

Personal life
In August 2011, Spanish tabloid magazine Cuore published photographs of Anaya kissing director Beatriz Sanchís at a naturist beach in Menorca. They were reportedly in a relationship from 2008 to 2013.

In November 2016, it was announced that Anaya was expecting her first child with her partner, Tina Afugu Cordero, a costume designer. In February 2017, Anaya gave birth to their son.

Filmography

Awards and nominations

References

External links

Elena Anaya at AllMovie
Elena Anaya at Yahoo! Movies

1975 births
Best Actress Goya Award winners
Spanish lesbian actresses
Living people
People from Palencia
Spanish film actresses
20th-century Spanish actresses
21st-century Spanish actresses
Method actors